V Satish (Satish Velankar) is the National Joint General Secretary (Organisation) of Bharatiya Janata Party (BJP). Currently he is in-charge of West-Zone (Rajasthan, Gujarat, Maharashtra) and Andhra Pradesh, Bharitya Janata Party. He is Full-time Worker, Rashtriya Swayamsevak Sangh and has been the senior functionary for the Rashtriya Swayamsewak Sangh.

Early life
Born in Nagpur district of Maharashtra on 23 May 1954.
He hails from Parbhani in Maharashtra. Educated from Shri shivaji College, Parbhani. Worked in north east for ABVP and RSS core activities before being shifted to BJP Assam Unit. He was zonal organising secretary of ABVP in North East Zone.

Education and early career

Association with RSS
Full-timer for RSS.

Association with the BJP
Working as General Secretary (Org.) in Amit Shah, National Team of BJP. Currently handling charge of Rajasthan, BJP.

He was posted at Bangalore in Karnataka State for handling operations of Bharatiya Janata Party.

References

1954 births
Activists from Maharashtra
Living people
Rashtriya Swayamsevak Sangh pracharaks
Bharatiya Janata Party politicians from Maharashtra
Politicians from Nagpur
People from Parbhani district
People from Marathwada